Matthew James Arthur Jeneroux  is a Canadian politician who has been elected to the House of Commons of Canada since the 2015 federal election. He is the Founder of Hi Dad Foundation, a mental health foundation focused on raising awareness about the importance of men’s mental health. He represents the electoral district of Edmonton Riverbend as a member of the Conservative Party of Canada caucus and is the Shadow Minister for Supply Chains. During the 43rd Canadian Parliament Jeneroux's private member bill An Act to amend the Canada Labour Code (bereavement leave) (Bill C-220) was adopted with all party support to extend bereavement leave from 5 to 10 days and entitle employees already on compassionate care leave to also claim bereavement leave.

Prior to his election to the House of Commons, he served in the Legislative Assembly of Alberta representing the electoral district of Edmonton-South West.

Jeneroux was a recipient of both the Queen Elizabeth II Diamond Jubilee Medal in 2012 and the Queen Elizabeth II Platinum Jubilee Medal in 2022.

In both 2016 and in 2017, Jeneroux was named one of the “Top Up and Comer’s” in Canadian Parliament by The Hill Times.

Early life and education
Jeneroux was born and raised in Edmonton and Sherwood Park, Alberta. He has a Bachelor of Arts from the University of Alberta. Prior to his work in provincial and then federal politics, Jeneroux worked for Health Canada and was an active community volunteer in Edmonton. He has two daughters: Molly and Lily and a son: Hugh.

Provincial politics
Jeneroux was first elected to the provincial assembly in the 2012 provincial election. In spring 2013, one year after being elected, he introduced a private member's bill entitled Compassionate Care Leave Legislation (Bill 203). The bill has gone through royal assent and provides a leave of absence for an employee from their employer while taking care of a terminally ill family member.

In just three years, he had two of his motions pass unanimously in the legislature. First, to provide support for playgrounds when new schools for young families are built in the province of Alberta. He also urged the provincial government to conduct a review of the childcare policy in the province. He chaired the Standing Committee on Legislative Offices. He was defeated in the 2015 provincial election.

He also chaired the Capital Region Caucus, Youth Secretariat, and was a member of the Alberta Treasury Board committee. In addition, he chaired Results Based Budgeting for Environment and Resource Stewardship, chaired Results Based Budgeting for Wellness, a member of Public Accounts committee, co-chair of the Alberta Film Advisory Council and chair of the Government of Alberta's Youth Advisory Panel.

In 2018, Jeneroux was named the co-chair of the United Conservative Party Annual General Meeting in Red Deer, Alberta.

Federal politics

MP Jeneroux was voted as the "Best Constituency MP in Canada" by his colleagues, staff & media in the May 2017 Hill Times Publication.

Jeneroux is also the chair of the Edmonton Region Caucus.

Jeneroux has been a member of the Parliamentary Standing Committee of Access to Information, Privacy and Ethics, a Member of the Standing Committee on Environment and Sustainable Development, a member of the Standing Committee on Public Accounts, vice-chair on the Standing Committee for Industry, a member of the Standing Committee on Transportation & Infrastructure and currently serves as the vice-chair of the Standing Committee on Health.

Health Shadow Minister

As a federal MP, Jeneroux is the Conservative Party of Canada Shadow Minister for Health.

As Health Canada Shadow Minister, Jeneroux has received praise for being the first to raise concerns in Parliament on the urgency of COVID-19 and lack of preparedness of the Public Health Agency of Canada. He's also been relentless in his pursuit to have Dr. Bruce Aylward from the World Health Organization appear before the Parliamentary committee responsible for investigating Canada's response to COVID-19. Even going as far as issuing a rare House of Commons summons to have him appear.

MP Jeneroux is also leading the charge on the changes to the Patented Medicine Prices Review Board (PMPRB)  calling on the government to ensure Canadians have access to live saving medicines.

Jeneroux also recently announced his latest Private Members’ Bill being the federal expansion of Compassionate Care Leave. This builds off the previous work from Jeneroux's provincial Private Members’ Bill at the National level.

Infrastructure Shadow Minister

MP Jeneroux has served previously as the Shadow Minister for Infrastructure, Communities & Urban Affairs. As Infrastructure Canada Shadow Minister, Jeneroux has also been one of the fiercest critics of Canada's Infrastructure Bank, going so far as calling for its cancellation. He did so publicly in an article published in the Financial Post where he calls it an outright failure of the Trudeau Liberals.

Innovation Shadow Minister

MP Jeneroux served in the role as Shadow Minister for Innovation, Science and Economic Development and as Shadow Minister of Science. Jeneroux was critical of the Minister of Innovation, Science and Economic Development in the press in calling for his government's long-awaited Space Strategy.

Jeneroux also co-sponsored an initiative to encourage young girls in Science, Technology, Engineering and Math (STEM) fields for an annual advocacy day on Parliament along with FIRST Lego League which showcased skills in LEGO and pushed for more policies geared to encouraging young girls to pursue careers in STEM related fields.

Previously, under Rona Ambrose, he served in the Shadow Cabinet as the Official Opposition Critic for Western Economic Diversification.

It was during this time that Jeneroux was named co-chair of the Alberta Jobs Task Force, a federal Conservative caucus initiative that will collect information from Albertans affected by the current economic situation and produce a report to be tabled in the House of Commons.

In this role, Jeneroux tabled a motion to promote the use of geothermal technology for the use in orphan and abandoned oil wells in western Canada. His motion, with support from the geothermal industry, called on the Government of Canada to examine ways to reduce the legislative burden on using geothermal technology within Canada.

In 2016, Jeneroux was voted as one of the Top 3 "Up and Comers" in Parliament by The Hill Times publication survey.

Mental Health Advocacy

In partnership with the Mental Health Commission of Canada & Movember on Father's Day Jeneroux organizes an annual mental health advocacy event on Parliament Hill to support raising awareness for mental health concerns in young men and fathers. The event attracts stakeholders, Senators & Parliamentarians, and advocacy groups from across the country to champion ongoing awareness supports for young fathers.
In November 2018, Jeneroux teamed with Kids with Cancer Society in Edmonton to raise money for their organization by sponsoring a breakfast cereal fundraiser, Corn Pops & Cocoa Puffs, with his wife, Dr. Elizabeth Clement.

Electoral record

Federal

Provincial

References

External links
Matt Jeneroux

Progressive Conservative Association of Alberta MLAs
Politicians from Edmonton
Living people
Conservative Party of Canada MPs
Members of the House of Commons of Canada from Alberta
University of Alberta alumni
21st-century Canadian politicians
1981 births